Andrew Wyllie may refer to:
 Andrew Wyllie (pathologist)
 Andrew Wyllie (engineer)

See also
 Andrew Wylie (disambiguation)